An incomplete list of events which occurred in Italy in 1695:

Event

 Basilica di Santa Croce (Lecce) completed.

Deaths
 Giovan Antonio de' Rossi, architect (born 1616)

References